Gusztáv is the Hungraian variant of the given name Gustav and may refer to:
Gusztáv Batthyány (1803–1883), Hungarian nobleman who bred horses in England where he was commonly known as Count Batthyány
Gusztáv Gratz (1875–1946), Hungarian politician, who served as Minister of Foreign Affairs in 1921
Gusztáv Hennyey (1888–1977), Hungarian politician and military officer, who served as Minister of Foreign Affairs in 1944 for a month
Gusztáv Leikep (born 1966), Hungarian sprint canoeist who competed in the late 1980s and early 1990s
Gusztáv Lifkai (born 1912), Hungarian field hockey player who competed in the 1936 Summer Olympics
Gusztáv Nemeskéri (born 1960), Hungarian serial killer
Gusztáv Sebes (born 1906), Hungarian footballer and coach
Gusztáv Vitéz Jány (1883–1947), Hungarian officer during World War II
Gusztáv, Hungarian series of animated short cartoons

Hungarian masculine given names